The Audit Office of the Central Military Commission  or simply Audit Office is the chief organ under the Central Military Commission of the People's Republic of China. It was founded on January 11, 2016, under Xi Jinping's military reforms. It is responsible for auditing People's Liberation Army and People's Armed Police Its current director is General Guo Chunfeng.

References

See also 

 Central Military Commission (China)
 National Audit Office (China)

Central Military Commission (China)
2016 establishments in China